The Journeying Boy is a 1949 mystery novel by Michael Innes. It was number 52 in The Top 100 Crime Novels of All Time list, despite not involving Innes's main character, Sir John Appleby.

Plot summary

The blurb bills reads, Humphrey Paxton, the son of one of Britain's leading atomic boffins, has taken to carrying a shotgun to 'shoot plotters and blackmailers and spies'. His new tutor, the plodding Mr Thewless, suggests that Humphrey might be overdoing it somewhat. But when a man is found shot dead at a cinema, Mr Thewless is plunged into a nightmare world of lies, kidnapping and murder - and grave matters of national security.

References

British mystery novels
1949 British novels
Victor Gollancz Ltd books
Novels by Michael Innes